Gianna Terribili-Gonzales (1882-1940) was an Italian film actress of the silent era. She appeared in more than forty films including the 1913 historical epic Antony and Cleopatra.

Selected filmography
Antony and Cleopatra (1913)
The Last Lord (1926)

References

Bibliography 
 Hatchuel, Sarah & Vienne-Guerrin, Nathalie. Shakespeare on Screen: The Roman Plays. Publication Univ Rouen Havre, 2009.

External links 
 
 MyMovies:Gianna Terribili-Gonzales 

1882 births
1940 deaths
People from Marino, Lazio
Italian film actresses
Italian silent film actresses
20th-century Italian actresses